Saint-Maurice-sur-Huisne (literally Saint-Maurice on Huisne) is a former commune in the Orne department in north-western France. On 1 January 2016, it was merged into the new commune of Cour-Maugis-sur-Huisne.

See also
Communes of the Orne department

References

Saintmauricesurhuisne